Delal Stadium (Arabic: ملعب دلال) is a multi-purpose stadium in Zakho, Northern Iraq. It is currently used mostly for football matches and serves as secondary venue of Zakho FC. The stadium holds 10,000 people.

See also 
List of football stadiums in Iraq

References

Football venues in Iraq
Athletics (track and field) venues in Iraq
Multi-purpose stadiums in Iraq
2011 establishments in Iraq
Sports venues completed in 2011